Roar Hoff (born 21 May 1965) is a retired Norwegian shot putter.

He finished twelfth at the 1994 European Championships and eleventh at the 1995 IAAF World Indoor Championships. He became Norwegian champion in 1992 and 1999.

His personal best throw was 19.52 metres, achieved in June 1994 in Drammen. This places him eighth among Norwegian shot putters through all time.

References

1965 births
Living people
SMU Mustangs men's track and field athletes
Norwegian male shot putters
Norwegian expatriate sportspeople in the United States